Paul Cicarella is an American politician who is currently serving as a Connecticut State senator representing the 34th District. Which encompasses multiple towns outside of New Haven. Cicarella is a member of the Republican Party.

Political career
Following the announcement of Len Fasano's retirement in March 2020, Cicarella began seeking the Republican nomination for the seat. Cicarella won the general election against April Capone on November 3, 2020. Winning important votes in larger towns such as East Haven. Cicarella currently serves as the Ranking Member of both the Senate Housing Committee and the Veterans' Affairs Committee.

References

External links

Living people
21st-century American politicians
Republican Party Connecticut state senators
People from North Haven, Connecticut
Year of birth missing (living people)